Nanjie is a village under the administration of the town of , Linying County, Henan. It is widely reported as being the last Maoist village in China, and has attracted considerable global attention due to its unique political and economic system.

History 
In 1979, village leader Wang Hongbin, who had been instated two years prior, and his colleagues pooled money to visit a neighbouring county to learn how to start a factory. After the trip, Wang and said colleagues established a flour mill and brick factory in Nanjie. In subsequent years, Wang would frequent Beijing to sell the village's flour and to earn manufacturing contracts. From 1981 to 1984, the village trialed China's household responsibility system, where the village's land and factories were privatized, but Nanjie officials reported that such a system resulted in a decline in agricultural output, an increase in crime, and general hostilities in the village. Following the re-collectivisation of Nanjie, the village saw its economy grow exponentially, and the village's government began supplying its villagers with free electricity, food, water, tuition, furnished apartments, healthcare, and life insurance. During the early 1990s, the village began attracting political attention from officials throughout Henan, which enabled it to gain large loans for new projects. Simultaneously, Nanjie began employing workers from outside the village in large numbers.

Politics 
The village is headed by Wang Hongbin, who has headed the village since 1977. Wang has adopted the title of ban zhang, which translates as "class monitor" or "squad leader", due to it being the lowest title an official can take.

Public portraits and statues of Karl Marx, Friedrich Engels, Vladimir Lenin, Joseph Stalin, and Mao Zedong are common throughout the village, and their images are highly celebrated. Nanjie and many other Maoist villages attract people opposing elements of capitalism, disgruntled old retired party cadres, new left intellectuals, and pro-Maoist protesters.

Judicial punishments in the village include mandatory "study classes", public denunciation, and expulsion from the village. Wang Hongbin himself underwent public denunciation after investing tens of millions of Yuan into a failed "perpetual motion machine" project which shut down in 2011. A 2002 paper also reported that corporal punishment has been used in the village.

Economy 

Nanjie collectivised its agricultural production and industry in 1986, a time when the rest of the country was doing the opposite, introducing market reforms put forward by former leader Deng Xiaoping. This followed a short four year stint of privatization under China's household responsibility system. The village has inspired a number of other villages in the country to re-collectivise.

The village operates the Nanjie Village Group, which offers all villagers employment in its various workplaces. The group pays village residents 30% of their salary in cash, and puts the remaining 70% of their salary in public services.

By 1990, Nanjie reported a gross domestic product of ¥47.00 million, which rose to over ¥103 million in 1991, ¥212.69 million in 1992, and ¥802.00 million in 1994. Over the next four years, the village's output nearly trebled to ¥1.8 billion. However, from 1998 to 2007, the village saw its gross domestic product fall over 20% down to just over ¥1.4 billion, and by 2007, the village's debt to GDP ratio exceeded 100%.

Nanjie hosts a number of factories and flour mills, and produces a number of foodstuffs, such as instant noodles and beer.

Labour 
The village attracts a large number of commuters from surrounding areas, which represent two or three times the local population. These commuters are not a part of the village's collectivization program, but receive a month salary along with free meals and a dormitory. The village's heavy reliance on those who live elsewhere has drawn criticism from the Southern Metropolis Daily, which ran a piece in 2008 accusing Nanjie's economy being propped up by cheap labourers who live elsewhere, and through large loans awarded by Communist Party officials.

One migrant labourer reported that migrants work 12-hour days, and are required to attend "political study sessions" after work.

Tourism 
The village receives a significant amount of red tourism from visitors throughout China.

See also 

 Red tourism
 Huaxi
 Dazhai
 Chinese New Left
 People's commune

References

External links
Photographic series on Nanije
Official Website (in Chinese and English)
Documentary at CCTV (in Chinese)
The Reddest Village in China: On the 90th anniversary of the Communist Party of China, Times reporters visit Nanjiecun, China, perhaps the country's last Maoist collective. NYTimes video by Jonah M. Kessel.

Villages in China
Utopian socialism
Maoism in China
Linying County